Brooklyn is a city in Cuyahoga County, Ohio, United States, and a suburb of Cleveland. The population was 11,359 at the 2020 census.

Geography
Brooklyn is located at  (41.435357, -81.744457).

Demographics

86.2% spoke English, 2.8% Spanish, 2.5% Arabic, 2.0% Italian, 1.7% German, and 1.4% Greek.

2000 census
As of the census of 2000, there were 11,586 people, 5,348 households, and 3,171 families living in the city. The population density was 2,704.4 people per square mile (1,045.2/km2). There were 5,521 housing units at an average density of 1,288.7 per square mile (498.1/km2). The racial makeup of the city was 92.66% White, 1.69% African American, 0.10% Native American, 2.28% Asian, 0.01% Pacific Islander, 1.63% from other races, and 1.62% from two or more races. Hispanic or Latino of any race were 3.88% of the population.

There were 5,348 households, out of which 22.1% had children under the age of 18 living with them, 44.3% were married couples living together, 11.1% had a female householder with no husband present, and 40.7% were non-families. 36.5% of all households were made up of individuals, and 15.4% had someone living alone who was 65 years of age or older. The average household size was 2.16 and the average family size was 2.84.

In the city the population was spread out, with 18.9% under the age of 18, 7.5% from 18 to 24, 28.4% from 25 to 44, 23.2% from 45 to 64, and 21.9% who were 65 years of age or older. The median age was 42 years. For every 100 females, there were 92.1 males. For every 100 females age 18 and over, there were 87.2 males.

The median income for a household in the city was $40,661, and the median income for a family was $46,696. The per capita income for the city was $21,439. About 5.2% of families and 12.0% of the population were below the poverty line, including 6.8% of those under age 18 and 6.8% of those age 65 or over.

2010 census
As of the census of 2010, there were 11,169 people, 5,153 households, and 2,926 families living in the city. The racial makeup of the city was 84.3% White, 5.2% African American, 0.2% Native American, 3.9% Asian, 4.0% from other races, and 2.4% from two or more races. Hispanic or Latino of any race were 10.4% of the population.

There were 5,153 households, of which 24.5% had children under the age of 18 living with them, 38.1% were married couples living together, 13.8% had a female householder with no husband present, 4.9% had a male householder with no wife present, and 43.2% were non-families. 37.4% of all households were made up of individuals, and 15.5% had someone living alone who was 65 years of age or older. The average household size was 2.17 and the average family size was 2.85.

The median age in the city was 42.9 years. 19.1% of residents were under the age of 18; 7.8% were between the ages of 18 and 24; 25.8% were from 25 to 44; 28.2% were from 45 to 64; and 19.2% were 65 years of age or older. The gender makeup of the city was 48.2% male and 51.8% female.

Economy

Top employers
According to the city's 2017 Comprehensive Annual Financial Report, the top employers in the city are:

Notable people
 David Birney - actor
 John M. Coyne - longest consecutive mayor in U.S. history
 Lee Fohl, baseball player and manager
 Jim Kavourias - baseball player
 Clint Nageotte - baseball player
 Jim Petro - Ohio politician
 Murray Salem - actor and screenwriter

Other notable things in Brooklyn

Brooklyn was home to the first seat belt law in 1966 and the first cell phone law for motorists in 1999.

The Hugo Boss Plant was closed for three months in 2009 and was going to ship the jobs overseas to Turkey; however, the union and the City of Brooklyn were able to reach a compromise and a three-year contract reopening the plant shortly after.

Brooklyn is home (next to city hall) to a decommissioned Lockheed T-33 Shooting Star (T-33A Tail #19263) jet plane.

Brooklyn High School gained attention on October 20, 1955, when Elvis Presley performed in its auditorium. It was the first ever concert Presley performed in the northern United States. It is also believed to be the first filmed concert in his career. It would be nearly a year before he appeared on The Ed Sullivan Show for the first time.

Presley was not the headliner at the concert organized by Cleveland DJ Bill Randle. The other, more popular performers were Bill Haley & His Comets, The Four Lads and Pat Boone.

On October 20, 2005, some of the acts returned to participate in an anniversary event for this visit. Among the acts were Priscilla Wright, and Bill Haley's Original Comets. The BHS Chorale also performed a song with Priscilla Wright. "Rock and Roll Hall of Fame and Museum designates Brooklyn High School a national rock 'n' roll landmark; Elvis Presley performed at the school on Oct 20, 1955".

Shopping
The city of Brooklyn added a newer shopping center in the late 1980s and early 1990s. Ridge Park Square is located on Ridge Road near Interstate 480, covering an area of 562,842 square feet with about 50 stores. It includes many chain stores and restaurants, but lost its largest tenant, Tops, in 2008. In 2012 Michaels arts and crafts store occupied the old Tops location. Ridge Park Square also contains the AMC Ridge Park Square Cinema 8 movie theater.

See also

 Memphis Kiddie Park
 Brooklyn High School

References

External links

 City website

Cities in Ohio
Cities in Cuyahoga County, Ohio
Populated places established in 1818
Cleveland metropolitan area